Hangzhou Mosque is an Islamic-style mosque located in Hangzhou, in Zhejiang Province. Hangzhou Mosque is one of the largest mosques in China. There is also the Hangzhou Islamic Society in the mosque.

History
There was only the Phoenix Mosque in Hangzhou, and in recent years the Muslim population in Hangzhou increased, so the need for a new mosque became urgent. The Hangzhou Mosque was included in the list of major construction projects and in 2011, and in the following year it was approved by the Hangzhou Development and Reform Commission, and the foundation-laying ceremony was held on 12 October 2012. The mosque was completed in 2016 and it was officially opened in May 2017.

Transportation
The mosque is accessible within walking distance south of Hangzhou East railway station.

See also
 List of mosques in China

References 

2017 establishments in China
Mosques in Hangzhou
Mosques completed in 2016